The curry tree, Murraya koenigii or Bergera koenigii, is a tropical and sub-tropical tree in the family Rutaceae (the rue family, which includes rue, citrus, and satinwood), native to Asia. The plant is also sometimes called sweet neem, though M. koenigii is in a different family to neem, Azadirachta indica, which is in the related family Meliaceae.

Its leaves, known as curry leaves, are used in many dishes in the Indian subcontinent.

Description

It is a small tree, growing ) tall, with a trunk up to  diameter. The plant produces small white flowers which can self-pollinate to produce small shiny-black drupes containing a single, large viable seed. The berry pulp is edible, with a sweet flavor.

Distribution and habitat
The tree is native to the Indian subcontinent. Commercial plantations have been established in India, and more recently Australia.

It grows best in well-drained soil that does not dry out, in areas with full sun or partial shade, preferably away from the wind. Growth is more robust when temperatures are at least .

Etymology and common names
The generic name, Murraya, derives from Johan Andreas Murray (1740–1791), who studied botany under Carl Linnaeus and became a professor of medicine with an interest in medicinal plants at the University of Göttingen, Germany.

The specific name, koenigii, derives from the last name of botanist Johann Gerhard König.

Curry tree is also called curry leaf tree or curry bush, among numerous local names, depending on country.

Uses
The fresh leaves are an indispensable part of Indian cuisine and Indian traditional medicines. They are most widely used in southern and west coast Indian cooking, usually fried along with vegetable oil, mustard seeds and chopped onions in the first stage of the preparation. They are also used to make thoran, vada, rasam, and kadhi; additionally, they are often dry-roasted (and then ground) in the preparation of various powdered spice blends (masalas), such as South Indian sambar masala, the main seasoning in the ubiquitous vegetable stew sambar. The curry leaves are also added as flavoring to masala dosa, the South Indian potato-filled crepes, made with a mildly probiotic, fermented lentil and rice batter. The fresh leaves are valued as seasoning in the cuisines of South and Southeast Asia. In Cambodia, where the leaves are called sloek kontroap, the leaves are roasted and used as an ingredient in a soup, maju krueng. In Java, the leaves are often stewed to flavor gulai. Though available dried, the aroma and flavor is greatly inferior. The oil can be extracted and used to make scented soaps.

The leaves of Murraya koenigii are also used as a herb in Ayurvedic and Siddha medicine in which they are believed to possess anti-disease properties, but there is no high-quality clinical evidence for such effects.

The seeds may be toxic to humans.

Propagation
Seeds must be ripe and fresh to plant; dried or shriveled fruits are not viable. The skin must peeled off, and this is recommended before planting. One can plant the whole fruit, but it is best to remove the pulp before planting in potting mix that is kept moist but not wet. Stem cuttings can be also used for propagation. In India it is mainly planted privately, but also cultivated commercially to a small extent.

Chemical constituents

Compounds found in curry tree leaves, stems, bark, and seeds include cinnamaldehyde, and numerous carbazole alkaloids, including mahanimbine, girinimbine, and mahanine.

Nutritionally, the leaves are a rich source of carotenoids, beta-carotene, calcium and iron.

References

External links

Plants used in Ayurveda
Murraya
Herbs
Indian spices